Ava's Possessions is a 2015 American supernatural comedy horror film written and directed by Jordan Galland. Louisa Krause stars as the titular Ava, a young woman that must learn how to put her life together after a demon is exorcised from her body. The film had its world premiere at the Dead by Dawn Horror Film Festival on April 26, 2015.

Plot
A priest (John Ventimiglia) successfully completes an exorcism on Ava (Louisa Krause), who is stunned to find that she has spent the last 28 days possessed by the demon Naphula. She is initially flippant towards her actions during this time, but soon discovers that she caused serious emotional and physical damage, resulting in her losing her job, friends, and boyfriend, as well as potential jail time. Ava's parents (William Sadler and Deborah Rush), sister (Whitney Able), and her sister's fiancée Roger (Zachary Booth) are all concerned for her. Her family pushes her into accepting a plea deal that would spare her jail time or commitment in a  facility for troubled ex-possessed people as long as she attended a rehabilitation program for the recently exorcised, as possessions are seen as a real, common phenomena. The program is led by Tony (Wass Stevens), a gruff man that insists that Ava take the program seriously as to do otherwise would just raise the likelihood that the demon would return, as repossessions will frequently happen. Participants will ultimately be tested by wearing a necklace that invites the demon back into their body. If they can pull the necklace off and reject the demon, they graduate since this shows that they are strong enough to deter future possessions. At one meeting Ava meets Hazel (Annabelle Dexter-Jones), a fellow ex-possessed person that wants her demon to return since she enjoyed its presence and felt that it was "special" for both of them.

While Ava is trying to piece together her missing 28 days she discovers blood stains on her floor. Ava's family is of little help, as Ava gets the impression they are hiding something. Her only clue to the person's identity is an engraved watch that leads her to Ben (Lou Taylor Pucci), who tells her that it belonged to his father. Sure that he is dead as a result of her, Ava lies to Ben about how she found the watch but ends up spending time with Ben. Lonely and confused as to what exactly caused her to become possessed, Ava agrees to help Hazel's demon return via a ritual, which results in Hazel getting committed. The ritual also leaves a tattoo on her neck, which Tony discovers. He throws her out of the program, as the tattoo makes it easy for the demon to return. Ava's family chooses to commit her but Ava manages to gain a lead on Ben's father via a prostitute. The prostitute is murdered before she can tell Ava anything. She is then recaptured and is put in a car with Roger, who is to take her to the asylum. However instead of taking her to the facility Roger instead tries to kiss her and reveals that he murdered the prostitute in order to keep her from telling anyone that he had visited her. She then discovers that while she did kill Ben's father, he was only in the apartment because he was a hitman that Roger had hired to murder her, as Ava had seen Roger with the prostitute and then joined the two of them for a sexual encounter. Roger drives Ava to Tony's now empty classroom, where he forces her to put on the necklace and bring back the demon, as he believes the two of them had a connection. While she’s possessed, Roger confesses his crimes in front of the facility's security cameras. Ava is able to control the demon and use its abilities to capture Roger. She then rips the necklace off.

The film ends with Ava rebuilding her life and working with Tony in the facility office. She soon begins to sense that the demon is near and accidentally causes some boxes to fall, revealing some old files on former possessed people. She discovers that her mother had also previously been possessed by the same demon, hinting that their bloodline is predisposed to possessions. Ava then recalls finding a tattoo similar to the one she received during the ritual, making her realize that her sister had deliberately sent the demon into her in order to avoid getting possessed herself. Furious, Ava begins screaming and the office door swings open, showing the shadow of Ava's demon.

Cast
 Louisa Krause as Ava
 Annabelle Dexter-Jones as Hazel
 Wass Stevens as Tony
 Whitney Able as Jillian
 Lou Taylor Pucci as Ben
 Carol Kane as Talia
 William Sadler as Bernard
 Alysia Reiner as Noelle
 Dan Fogler as JJ Samson
 Joel de la Fuente as Escobar
 John Ventimiglia as Father Merrino
 Deborah Rush as Joanna
 Zachary Booth as Roger
 Geneva Carr as Darlene
 Jemima Kirke as Ivy
 Olivia Anton as little demon girl

Reception 
Critical reception for Ava's Possessions has been mixed and the film holds a rating of 69% on Rotten Tomatoes, based on 16 reviews. Entertainment Weekly wrote a mostly favorable review, criticizing it for having too many plot threads in one movie but stating that "Krause’s deadpan wit, coupled with the inspired scenes at Spirit Possessions Anoymous, make Ava’s Possessions a fun, fresh take on a genre staple." Bloody Disgusting shared a similar opinion and noted that while the film was flawed, it had good acting and was "still a unique film that deserves a watch to see that not every possession film has to be told the same way." The New York Times was more critical, writing that "Though at times pleasingly quirky, the story is too slackly written and insipidly photographed to entertain."

References

External links
 
 

2015 comedy horror films
2010s American films
2010s English-language films
2010s supernatural horror films
American comedy horror films
American supernatural horror films
Demons in film
Films about spirit possession
Supernatural comedy films